Neuhammer may refer to:
 Neuhammer (Rietschen), village in the municipality of Rietschen in the Görlitz district, Saxony, Germany
 German name of Świętoszów, a village in the administrative district of Gmina Osiecznica, Poland
 German name of Nowa Kuźnia, Opole Voivodeship, a village in the administrative district of Gmina Prószków, Poland

See also 

 Nehammer